935–939 Broadway is a six-story Italianate brownstone structure designed by the architect Griffith Thomas in the Flatiron District of Manhattan, New York City.

History 
The six-story Italianate building, commissioned by Richard Mortimer, was built between 1861–1862 and was designed by architect Griffith Thomas. Throughout its lifetime, the structure has been referred to as the Mortimer Building, the Albert Building, and the Glenham Hotel. Early tenants include Bryant, Stratton & Packard's New York City Business College and the J.&C. Johnston Dry Goods company that opened in 1881. The building originally had five stories and a sixth story was added in 1919 by the architects Rouse & Goldstone.

Glenham Hotel 
Conflicting information exists that refers to this building as the former Glenham Hotel. The Glenham Hotel however has been listed as 153 and 155 Fifth Avenue, now the address of the adjacent Scribner Building.

On April 2, 1882, 51-year-old Cornelius Jeremiah Vanderbilt committed suicide in his fifth floor room, number 80, by firing his Smith & Wesson revolver into his left temple. 

In 2021, the building began hosting the site of the first official Wizarding World and Harry Potter flagship store in New York City, now simply referred to as "Harry Potter New York".

Gallery

References 

1862 establishments in New York (state)
Broadway (Manhattan)
Buildings and structures in Manhattan
Fifth Avenue
Flatiron District
Residential buildings completed in 1862